Meiling, also spelled Mei Ling, Mei-ling or May-ling, is a feminine Chinese given name. According to Taiwan's 2010 census, it was the third most popular name for women, with 27,914 having the name.

People
 Chen Mei-ling (born 1958), Republic of China politician
 Guo Meiling or Guo Meimei (born 1991), Chinese internet celebrity
 Hou Meiling or Melek Hu (born 1989), Chinese-born Turkish table tennis player
 Meiling Jin (born 1956), Guyanese author
 Mei-Ling Lam (born 1984), Playboy Playmate of the Month for June 2011
 Meiling Melançon (born 1980), American television and film actress
 Mayling Ng, actress
 Soong Mei-ling (1898–2003), wife of Republic of China President Chiang Kai-shek
 May Ling Su, pornographic actress 
 Mei Ling Young, Malaysian social scientist
 Yung Mei Ling or Barbara Yung (1959–1985), Hong Kong television actress
 Mei-Ling Tse, the Chinese name for Cynthia Tse Kimberlin, American ethnomusicologist

Fictional characters
 Hong Meiling, a character from the game series Touhou Project
 Mei ling Hwa Darling, a supporting character from the TV series Dirty Sexy Money
 Mei Ling, a character in the video game series Metal Gear
 Mei-Ling, a twin sister character that had merged with Hsien-Ko in the Darkstalkers video game series
 Meiling Li, a supporting character from the Cardcaptor Sakura anime
 May-Ling Shen, a character from the Highlander franchise
 Mei-Ling Zhou, known in-game as Mei, a character from the video game Overwatch
 Mei Ling, a character from the 1973 film Enter the Dragon, played by Betty Chung
 Chin Mei-ling, the main character in An Ocean Apart by Gillian Chan

References

See also
 Meilin (disambiguation)
 Meiling (disambiguation), for locations and people using as surname

Chinese feminine given names